Emma of Blois ( 950 – 27 December 1003) was Duchess consort of Aquitaine by marriage to William IV, Duke of Aquitaine. She ruled Aquitaine as regent for her son, William V, Duke of Aquitaine, from 996 until 1004.

Life 
She was the daughter of Theobald I, Count of Blois and Luitgarde of Vermandois.
In 968, she married William IV, Duke of Aquitaine. His overindulging in hunting and women offended her greatly. Around 990, he retired to a monastery. During the course of her marriage, she founded the monastery of Saint Peter in Bourgueil and the abbey of Maillezais. Emma then ruled Aquitaine as regent for their son William V.

See also
Dukes of Aquitaine family tree

Notes

References

950s births
1003 deaths
Duchesses of Aquitaine
Countesses of Anjou
10th-century women rulers
11th-century women rulers
10th-century French women
10th-century French people
11th-century French women
11th-century French people
House of Blois